Clément Tainmont (born 13 February 1986) is a French professional footballer who plays as a left winger.

Club career
He plays as midfielder and began his career with professional club Valenciennes under the tutelage of former manager Daniel Leclercq. Tainmont previously played for amateur club Dunkerque, Amiens SC and Châteauroux.

On 28 January 2014, he left France for Belgian Pro League side Sporting Charleroi on a -year deal.

After not playing in the 2020–21 season, on 13 July 2021 he signed a one-year contract with Mouscron, after a try-out.

Honours
Mechelen
 Belgian Cup: 2018–19

References

External links
 
 
 

1986 births
Living people
Sportspeople from Valenciennes
Association football wingers
French footballers
Championnat National players
Ligue 2 players
Belgian Pro League players
Challenger Pro League players
US Lesquin players
USL Dunkerque players
Stade de Reims players
Amiens SC players
LB Châteauroux players
R. Charleroi S.C. players
K.V. Mechelen players
Royal Excel Mouscron players
French expatriate footballers
Expatriate footballers in Belgium
Footballers from Hauts-de-France
French expatriate sportspeople in Belgium